Roe Valley Hospital is a health facility in Benevenagh Drive, Limavady, Northern Ireland.

History
The facility has its origins in the Newtown Limavady Union Workhouse which was designed by George Wilkinson and was completed in March 1842. It became the Limavady District Hospital in 1932 and, after joining the National Health Service in 1948, the facility evolved to become Roe Valley Hospital. After services transferred to Altnagelvin Area Hospital, Roe Valley Hospital closed in 1997. The buildings were subsequently restored by the Limavady Community Development Initiative, a local charity. In 2011 the facility was used as the venue for a play by a local theatre company and it continues to be used for local health services such as diabetes clinics.

References 

Hospitals established in 1842
1842 establishments in Ireland
Hospital buildings completed in 1842
Defunct hospitals in Northern Ireland
Hospitals in County Londonderry
Western Health and Social Care Trust
19th-century architecture in Northern Ireland